"And the Band Played Waltzing Matilda" is a song written by Scottish-born Australian singer-songwriter Eric Bogle in 1971. The song describes war as futile and gruesome, while criticising those who seek to glorify it. This is exemplified in the song by the account of a young Australian serviceman who is maimed during the Gallipoli Campaign of the First World War. The protagonist, who had travelled across rural Australia before the war, is emotionally devastated by the loss of his legs in battle. As the years pass he notes the death of other veterans, while the younger generation becomes apathetic to the veterans and their cause. At its conclusion, the song incorporates the melody and a few lines of lyrics of the 1895 song "Waltzing Matilda" by Australian poet Banjo Paterson.

Many cover versions of the song have been performed and recorded, as well as many versions in foreign languages.

Narrative 

The song is an account of the memories of an old Australian man who, as a youngster, had travelled across rural Australia as a swagman, "waltzing [his] Matilda" (carrying his "swag", a combination of portable sleeping gear and luggage) all over the bush and Outback. In 1915, he joined the Australian armed forces and was sent to Gallipoli. For "ten weary weeks", he kept himself alive as "around [him] the corpses piled higher". Eventually, he is wounded by a shell burst and awakens in hospital to find that he has lost his legs. He declares it to be a fate worse than death, as he can "go no more waltzing Matilda".

When the ship carrying the young soldiers had left Australia, the band played "Waltzing Matilda" while crowds waved flags and cheered. When the crippled narrator returns and "the legless, the armless, the blind, the insane" are carried down the gangway to the same popular music, the people watch in silence and turn their faces away. As an old man, he now watches his comrades march in Anzac Day parades from his porch. As the war falls out of living memory, young people question the purpose of the observances, and he finds himself doing the same. With each passing year, the parades become smaller, as "more old men disappear", and he observes that "some day, no one will march there at all".

Composition and style

Interviewed by The Sydney Morning Herald in 2002, Bogle said that as a 12-year-old boy in Peebles, Scotland in 1956, he had purchased a set of bound volumes of World War Illustrated, a weekly "penny dreadful propaganda sheet", which had been published during World War I. Bogle was inspired by the photography and felt a sense of "...the enormity of the conflict and its individual toll". In his teens he was a voracious reader of everything on the war and already knew much about the Anzacs' role at Gallipoli before he emigrated to Australia in 1969.

He told The Sydney Morning Herald:
A lot of people now think the song is traditional. And a lot of people think that I died in the war, and penned it in blood as I expired in the bottom of a trench. I never thought the song would outlast me, but I have decided now there's no doubt it will. For how long, I have no idea. Nothing lasts forever. Hopefully it'll be sung for quite a few years down the track, especially in this country. And hopefully it will get to the stage where everyone forgets who wrote it.

A couple of years after arriving in Australia, Bogle found himself at a Remembrance Day parade in Canberra and the song was the result of that event. The song was written in the space of two weeks. Interviewed in 2009 for The Scotsman, he said:
I wrote it as an oblique comment on the Vietnam War which was in full swing… but while boys from Australia were dying there, people had hardly any idea where Vietnam was. Gallipoli was a lot closer to the Australian ethos – every schoolkid knew the story, so I set the song there. ... At first the Returned Service League and all these people didn't accept it at all; they thought it was anti-soldier, but they've come full circle now and they see it's certainly anti-war but not anti-soldier.

Written in 1971, the coincidence with the Vietnam War has not been missed as it rails against the romanticising of war. As the old man sits on his porch, watching the veterans march past every Anzac Day, he muses "The young people ask what are they marching for, and I ask myself the same question".

Background 
The song was originally eight verses long but Bogle pared it down to five verses. In 1974 Bogle, entered the National Folk Festival songwriting competition, in Brisbane, which offered a first prize of a $300 Ovation guitar. Bogle sang two songs, with Matilda as the second. He later recalled:
I sang the first song and got polite applause. Then I did Matilda, and for the first time, and thankfully not the last, there was a second's silence after I finished. I thought, "I've fucked it here." I hadn't sung it very well. Then this storm of applause broke out and I thought, "Ovation guitar, come to daddy!" Well, that wasn't my first thought, but it was pretty close to my first thought.

The judges awarded the song third place but their decision caused a small storm of protest, focusing more attention on the song, Bogle thought, than outright victory would have done. Jane Herivel from the Channel Islands had heard Bogle sing at the festival and requested Bogle to send her a recording. She sang it at a festival in the south of England where folk-singer June Tabor heard it and later recorded it for her 1976 debut solo album Airs and Graces. Unknown to Bogle, the song became famous in the UK and North America; so when Bogle was in the UK in 1976 he was surprised to be asked to perform at a local folk club on the strength of the song.

Historical accuracy 
The line "they gave me a tin hat" is anachronistic, as steel helmets were not issued to British and Empire troops at Gallipoli.

Walsh (2018) suggests that the line "they marched me away to the war" implies compulsion in the form of conscription, whereas all Australian troops in Europe were volunteers, and the government did not force conscripts to fight overseas.

The song refers to the fighting at Suvla Bay in the lines:

The vast majority of the 16,000 Australian and New Zealand troops landed not at Suvla but at Anzac Cove, 8 kilometres to the south, and some 15 weeks earlier. There was a small Australian presence at Suvla, the Royal Australian Naval Bridging Train, an engineering and construction unit comprising 350 men, of whom none were killed during the initial landing and two by the time the campaign was abandoned eleven months later. Bogle states that he substituted "Suvla" for "Anzac" because at the time he wrote the song (1971) there was a "deeply ingrained misconception" amongst Australians that all their troops had fought entirely at Suvla. He also states that it was easier to incorporate the word "Suvla" into the lyric.

Covers 

The first release of the song was by John Currie on the Australian label M7 in 1975.

Other cover versions of the song have been performed and recorded by Katie Noonan (Flametree Festival Byron Bay 08), The Irish Rovers, Joan Baez, Priscilla Herdman, Liam Clancy, Martin Curtis, The Dubliners, Ronnie Drew, Danny Doyle, Slim Dusty, The Fenians, Mike Harding, Jolie Holland, Seamus Kennedy, Johnny Logan and Friends, John Allan Cameron, John McDermott, Midnight Oil, Christy Moore, William Crighton, The Sands Family, the Skids, John Williamson, The Bushwackers and the bluegrass band Kruger Brothers, Redgum, John Schumann, Tickawinda (on the album Rosemary Lane), Orthodox Celts, The Houghton Weavers, The Pogues and Bread and Roses. Audrey Auld-Mezera (on the album Billabong Song), Garrison Keillor has also performed it on his radio show A Prairie Home Companion when ANZAC Day (25 April) has fallen on a Saturday and has also performed his own adaptation titled And the Band Played The Star-Spangled Banner. Phil Coulter released a cover on his 2007 album Timeless Tranquility - 20 Year Celebration.

American Vietnam veteran and Medal of Honor recipient Senator Bob Kerrey, who lost half his leg in the war, sang the song to his supporters after being elected to the United States Senate in 1988, and borrowed the first line for the title of his 2002 autobiography, When I Was A Young Man: A Memoir. Every year on 25 April, Lucy Ward is invited to sing the song at the annual ANZAC Day service held at the Gallipoli Memorial at the National Memorial Arboretum at Alrewas. Whilst touring the country, in April 2014, Ward also performed the song to a capacity crowd at The Grand Pavilion in Matlock Bath.

Non-English versions
The song was translated into French (Et l'orchestre jouait la valse de Mathilde) by the musical duo Ambages in 2014.

Recognition and awards

In 1986 the song was given a Gold Award 1986 by the Australasian Performing Right Association (APRA). In May 2001 the APRA, as part of its 75th Anniversary celebrations, named "And the Band Played Waltzing Matilda" as one of the Top 30 Australian songs of all time.

See also
 "No Man's Land"
 List of anti-war songs

References

External links
 And The Band Played Waltzing Matilda lyrics at ericbogle.net, the writer's official website
 Audio of 'And the Band Played Waltzing Matilda' – sung by Eric Bogle and played by the Franklyn B Paverty Bush Band
 Interview with Eric Bogle about the song from The Sydney Morning Herald, 2002

1971 songs
APRA Award winners
Australian folk songs
Australian country music songs
Eric Bogle songs
Slim Dusty songs
John Williamson (singer) songs
Pogue Mahone songs
The Dubliners songs
Midnight Oil songs
Joan Baez songs
Anti-war songs
Works about the Gallipoli campaign

Songs about World War I